The Clarke–Hobbs–Davidson House, also known as the Masonic Temple and Charles A. Hobbs House, is a historic home located at Hendersonville, Henderson County, North Carolina. It was built about 1907, and is a two-story, brick, transitional Queen Anne / Colonial Revival style dwelling.  A rear brick addition was built about 1958, after it was acquired by the Masons for use as a Masonic Lodge. It features a one-story hip roofed full-width porch and a tall deck-on-hip roof.

It was listed on the National Register of Historic Places in 1989.

References

Houses on the National Register of Historic Places in North Carolina
Queen Anne architecture in North Carolina
Colonial Revival architecture in North Carolina
Houses completed in 1907
Houses in Henderson County, North Carolina
National Register of Historic Places in Henderson County, North Carolina
Hendersonville, North Carolina